Izet Hajdarhodžić (25 December 1929 – 12 December 2006) was a Croatian actor. He appeared in more than thirty films from 1967 to 1989.

Selected filmography

References

External links 

1929 births
2006 deaths
Croatian male film actors
People from Trebinje